Dyschirius ferrugineus is a species of ground beetle in the subfamily Scaritinae. It was described by Bousquet in 1988.

References

ferrugineus
Beetles described in 1988